Cradle of Filth are an English extreme metal band from Suffolk. Formed in 1991, the group originally consisted of lead vocalist Dani Filth (real name Daniel Davey), guitarist Paul Ryan, bassist Jon Kennedy (real name Jon Pritchard), keyboardist Benjamin Ryan (brother of Paul Ryan), and drummer Darren "Daz" Gardner. The band's current lineup includes Filth alongside drummer Martin "Marthus" Škaroupka (since 2006), bassist Daniel Firth (since 2012), guitarists Marek "Ashok" Šmerda (since 2014) and Donny Burbage (since 2022), and keyboardist and female vocalist Zoe Marie Federoff (since 2022).

History

1991–1998
Cradle of Filth (COF) was formed in 1991 by Dani Filth with Paul Ryan, Jon Kennedy, Benjamin Ryan and Daz Gardner. After recording their first demo Invoking the Unclean, released in January 1992, the group added second guitarist Robin Graves (real name Robin Eaglestone) who debuted on their second demo tape Orgiastic Pleasures Foul. Shortly after its release, Kennedy left and Graves switched to the role of bassist, with Paul Allender brought in to take over on second guitar. The new lineup released Total Fucking Darkness at the end of 1992, after which Gardner left the group. He was replaced by William "Was" Sarginson. During a tour alongside Emperor in 1993, Sarginson was replaced by Nicholas Barker. Around the same time, the band added Andrea Meyer as their first female backup vocalist.

During the tour with Emperor, COF signed with new label Cacophonous Records. Later in 1993, they recorded their debut full-length album The Principle of Evil Made Flesh, which was released early the next year. After touring throughout 1994, COF recorded their planned second album for Cacophonous in 1995, with Sarah Jezebel Deva (real name Sarah Ferridge) taking over from Meyer and former bassist Jon Kennedy returning in place of Graves. However, due to legal disputes the album was not released, and the band eventually parted ways with the label, during which time the Ryan brothers, Allender and Kennedy all left the band. The collection was later released as Dusk and Her Embrace: The Original Sin in 2016. During the autumn, guitarist Stuart Anstis, returning bassist Graves, and keyboardist Damien Gregori all joined.

With their new lineup, COF released V Empire or Dark Faerytales in Phallustein on Cacophonous and Dusk and Her Embrace on Music for Nations in 1996. Gian Pyres (real name Gianpiero Piras) took over as second guitarist during the recording of Dusk and Her Embrace, but did not perform on the album. In the summer of 1997, Gregori was dismissed from the group. He was replaced by Les "Lecter" Smith, who debuted along with Pyres on 1998's Cruelty and the Beast.

1998–2006
During the recording of the EP From the Cradle to Enslave, the band went through several drummer changes – in early 1999, Barker left to join Dimmu Borgir; he was initially replaced by former member Was Sarginson, followed briefly by Dave Kunt (real name Dave Hirschheimer), and finally by Adrian Erlandsson in the summer. In July 1999, after the EP was recorded, Pyres left Cradle of Filth. By October, Stuart Anstis and Les Smith had also parted ways with the group; the former was reportedly sacked, while the latter left. Stuart Anstis passed away in August 2022 at the age of 48. Shortly after their departures, a new lineup was announced including returning guitarists Paul Allender and Pyres. After initially touring with Mark Newby-Robson on keyboards, the band brought in Martin Powell as Smith's permanent replacement.

After the band released Midian in 2000, Bitter Suites to Succubi in 2001 and Live Bait for the Dead in 2002, their next lineup change came in July 2001 when long-term bassist Robin Graves left for "personal reasons". He was replaced by Dave Pybus, initially on a temporary basis but later permanently. Pyres left the group for a second time in August 2002. After the recording of Damnation and a Day, he was replaced by James McIlroy (sometimes credited as "Germs Warfare").

Nymphetamine was released in 2004, before another string of lineup changes. First, in January 2005, Pybus left the band for "personal reasons". Powell followed in May, claiming similar reasons for his departure. McIlroy also left in August, with Pybus returning on bass and his replacement Charles Hedger taking over the vacated guitar role. The 2006 album Thornography was recorded with former touring keyboardist Mark Newby-Robson, while Rosie Smith handled keyboards on a touring basis. Shortly after the release of Thornography in October 2006, Erlandsson left to focus on his work in two side projects. He was replaced by Martin "Marthus" Škaroupka.

Since 2006
COF's 2008 album Godspeed on the Devil's Thunder was recorded by the core quartet of Filth, Allender, Pybus and Škaroupka (along with Deva), as Hedger had stepped back into a touring only role. Shortly after its release, Deva left the band after a series of altercations with Filth. By the summer of 2009, touring members Hedger and Smith had been replaced by returning guitarist James McIlroy and new keyboardist Ashley Ellyllon (who also handled Deva's vocals), respectively. Ellyllon performed on 2010's Darkly, Darkly, Venus Aversa, before she was replaced by Caroline Campbell in early 2011. By the time the band started recording The Manticore and Other Horrors in spring 2012, Campbell had left and Pybus had been replaced by Daniel Firth.

During the subsequent promotional touring cycle, in early 2013 COF added Lindsay Schoolcraft as their new keyboardist and second vocalist. She was made an official full-time member the following year. During a co-headlining tour with Behemoth in February 2014, Allender and McIlroy were replaced by Richard Shaw and Marek "Ashok" Šmerda due to "hugely important family matters" and "serious neck surgery," respectively. Upon returning from the tour, the group began working on a new record ahead of schedule, later announcing the departure of Allender in the summer. McIlroy was ultimately unable to return due to ongoing problems with his neck injury, so both replacement guitarists remained in the group. The new lineup released Hammer of the Witches in 2015 and Cryptoriana: The Seductiveness of Decay in 2017.

In February 2020, Schoolcraft announced that she had left COF, writing in an online release that "it was the best thing to do for my well-being and mental health". She was replaced by Anabelle Iratni, who performed on new album Existence Is Futile but was not unveiled until her live debut the following May.

Members

Current

Former

Unofficial

Timeline

Lineups

References

External links
Cradle of Filth official website

Cradle of Filth